Cataclysta polystictalis is a Crambidae species in the genus Cataclysta. It was described by George Hampson in 1906 and is known from New Guinea.

References

Moths described in 1906
Acentropinae